Hille Sarapuu (since 1970 Bachmann; born 12 December 1937) is an Estonian speed skater, cyclist and motorcycle rider.

She was born in Tallinn.

She began her skating career in 1952. She is multiple-times Estonian champion in different speed skating disciplines.

In 1954 she won two silver medals at Estonian championships in cycling.

Since 1956 she started her career in motocross, coached by Virve Lauri. 1962-1965 she won 4 medals at Soviet Union motocross championships.

1961 she played a role in the film Dangerous Curves. On 25 July 1968, while a member of the Soviet delegation to the International Motorsport Federation returning home from Vienna, Sarapuu defected at an Austrian police station. She refused to meet with representatives of the Soviet Union. She soon moved on to the United States, where she has made a permanent home. In the United States, She began working as a hairdresser and now lives in  He lives in Baltimore.

References

Living people
1937 births
Estonian female speed skaters
Estonian female cyclists
Estonian motorcycle racers
Soviet defectors to the United States
Estonian emigrants to the United States
Sportspeople from Tallinn